The Southern Francophone Education Region No. 4 is a French first language authority within the Canadian province of Alberta operated out of Calgary.

A merger between the Conseil scolaire catholique et francophone du Sud de l'Alberta and the Conseil scolaire du Sud de l'Alberta in August 2013 led to the creation of Conseil scolaire FrancoSud.

See also 
List of school authorities in Alberta

References

External links
 Conseil scolaire FrancoSud 

Education in Calgary
School districts in Alberta
French-language school districts in Canada